Wallace Johnson may refer to:

Wallace Johnson (baseball) (born 1956), an American former professional baseball player and coach
Wallace E. Johnson (1901–1988), co-founder of Holiday Inn
Wallace F. Johnson (1889–1971), American tennis player
Wallace J.S. Johnson (1913–1979), Mayor of Berkeley, California during the Sixties

See also
I. T. A. Wallace-Johnson (1894–1965), Sierra Leonean and British West African workers' leader